Sebastian Pigott (born February 14, 1983) is a Canadian singer and actor. He was a contestant on the sixth season of Canadian Idol, in 2008. He has guest-starred on numerous television series, including Murdoch Mysteries and Revenge.

Life and career
Pigott has subsequently appeared in such network television shows as The Listener, Heartland, The Border and Deadliest Sea. His most prominent role to date has been that of barista Kai Booker on CBC Television's Being Erica (seasons 2 to 4), for which he and his brother Oliver wrote the songs "Alien Like You" and "Hard To Go".

Pigott and his brother Oliver have created a band called Pigott Brothers and released their debut album called Pigottry in 2009. Their second album, The Age Of Peace, was released in the fall of 2012.

Filmography

Film

Television

Discography

With the Pigott Brothers

Singles

References

External links

1983 births
Living people
Canadian male film actors
Canadian Idol participants
Canadian pop singers
Canadian male television actors
21st-century Canadian male actors
21st-century Canadian male singers